The Kamuna refugee camp massacre, also known as al-Kamouna refugee camp massacre or the Sarmada camp air strike, occurred on 5 May 2016, during the Syrian civil war. Between 28 to 30 people were killed in the Kamuna refugee camp near Sarmada, northern Syria, initially reported to be by bombing from warplanes. Children were among the killed. The attack came during the truce negotiations between the warring factions.

Witnesses state that the camp was struck twice, causing many tents to be set on fire.

Events
After the forces of Bashar al-Assad conducted an offensive on Aleppo in April 2016, an informal settlement, Ghita Al-Rahmeh, near the village of Al-Kamoneh, was assembled to host over 2,500 refugees (450 families) who fled from Aleppo towards the north. There were no military targets near the refugee camp, and it was clearly visible from the sky. At that time, the war planes flying over the province were typically those of the Syrian Armed Forces and the Russian Air Forces.

UN Secretary-General Ban Ki-moon and other United Nations officials condemned the attack and declared it a possible war crime. Ki-moon once again urged the Security Council to refer the situation in Syria to the International Criminal Court (ICC). The UNCHR called the attack a "shocking disregard for civilian life" and described it as a "flagrant violation of international humanitarian and human rights law".

Syrian military representatives stated that they had not targeted the camp. Russia stated that none of its aircraft had flown over the refugee camp, and its air-space monitoring data showed no flights by any aircraft over the camp. Russia's Defense Ministry officials stated that damage shown in photographs and video suggested the camp may have been hit by multiple launch rocket systems which were being used in the area by Al-Nusra. The OHCHR chief Zeid Ra'ad Al-Hussein said that the initial reports of the camp being hit by Syrian Air Force jets was not verified.

See also
List of massacres during the Syrian Civil War
List of Syrian Civil War barrel bomb attacks
Darayya massacre

References

External links
Video of the aftermath of the attack
Photo of weapon strike area, Ahmed Hasan Ubeyd, Anadolu Agency

Airstrikes conducted by the Syrian Air Force in the Syrian civil war
Massacres of the Syrian civil war perpetrated by the Syrian Army
Massacres of the Syrian civil war in 2016
May 2016 crimes in Asia
2016 in Syria
Idlib Governorate in the Syrian civil war
May 2016 events in Syria